The INAS 330 is an Indian naval air squadron based at INS Shikra, Mumbai.

History 
Among the most potent weapon platforms in the Naval inventory is the Westland Sea King helicopter. This versatile and advanced multi role aircraft has taken modern age maritime warfare to theatres well beyond the nation’s shores. INAS 330 was commissioned on 17 April 1971 under the command of Cdr M P Wadhawan. The squadron was initially equipped with Westland Sea King Mk 42 ASW helicopters acquired from British Westland Helicopters Ltd.

From then on the indomitable team of Harpoons and ‘Mother’ (the carrier) saw a series of firsts. The first operational ASW mission was flown on 18 October 1971. On 31 November 1971, while on an ‘Advance Screen’, a Sea King picked up a suspected submarine contact and carried out a Vectored attack for the first time. The Harpoons received their baptism with fire when hostilities broke out in 1971. Extensive ASW operations were undertaken and the Harpoons clocked over 156 hours of war effort. Over the decade the Harpoons continued to operate from INS Vikrant as the only front line carrier borne rotary wing squadron and earned the honour and reputation of being the most versatile and baleful of the whirly birds. The squadron got greater punch with the procurement of Sea King 42B which have an improved sensor fit and capability for Anti-Shipping strikes.

The squadron shifted to INS Shikra, Mumbai from INS Garuda, Kochi in October 1995 and has been based there ever since. As always the Harpoons continue to remain the eyes and ears of the fleet. Aptly named the flying frigate, the Sea Kings continue to act as force multipliers while operating from INS Viraat, Godavari class frigates and Brahmaputra class frigates. The ship borne flights continue to execute multifarious missions in all weather – by day and night.

References 

Aircraft squadrons of the Indian Navy
Naval units and formations of India